The blue-speckled nudibranch (Dendrodoris caesia)  is a species of sea slug, a dorid nudibranch. It is a marine gastropod mollusc in the family Dendrodorididae.

Distribution
This species has so far only been found around the southern African coast from the Cape Peninsula to Port Elizabeth subtidally to at least 20 m. It is probably endemic.

Description

The blue-speckled nudibranch is a large nudibranch with a frilly margin. The speckles can be almost continuous and in some specimens the animal is pink-speckled. The rhinophores are perfoliate and the gill rosette is large and blue-edged. It may reach a total length of 120 mm.

Ecology
This species feeds on a yellow-brown sponge. The egg mass is a messy ribbon of several whorls.

References

Dendrodorididae
Gastropods described in 1905